Alexander Stefan Rudnay de Rudna et Divékujfalu (4 October 1760 – 13 September 1831) was a Hungarian–Slovak Roman Catholic prelate. He started as a parish priest, but later he became the Archbishop of Esztergom, the Prince Primate of Hungary and a Cardinal.

Life 
Alexander Rudnay was born to a family of lower nobility, which originated from the ancient Hungarian gens (clan) Divék. The Rudnay family also preserved its coat of arms from the genus: a brown bear under an extensive foliage of tee with blue background. His parents were András (Andrej) Rudnay, a servants' judge and Anna Dőry. He studied in secondary school (gymnasium) in Nitra (Nyitra), later in Emerican in Pressburg, philosophy in Trnava (Nagyszombat), theology in Buda and, finally, in the general seminary in Pressburg.

He was ordained on October 12, 1783, in Trnava, and in April 1784 he received his doctor degree in theology. In January 1785 started his spiritual career, and he was sent as a chaplain to Častá (Cseszte). Afterwards, he served in Hronský Beňadik (Garamszentbenedek), Trnava and Krušovce (Nyitrakoros). In 1805 he became the canonical clergyman in Esztergom, 1806 rector of the priest seminary in Trnava and, a theology professor, 1808 a titular bishop, a general vicarius in Esztergom, and  a viceroy's councilor. He was appointed as the bishop of Transylvania seated in Gyulafehérvár in 1816.  In December 1819 Alexander Rudnay obtained the papal bull with his nomination to archbishop of Esztergom and primate of Hungary. Upon the emperor's personal request, he moved his seat 1820 from Trnava to Esztergom. He was further the member of the Table of the Lords, secretary of the royal chancellery,  and of the Secret Council. He adhered to the imperial court in Vienna and supported the Slovak culture, especially he saw that Slovak parishes were assigned to Slovak priests. In 1828, Pope Leo XII named him a Cardinal. It is from this period that his most famous statement comes: „Slavus sum, et si in catedra Petri forem, Slavus ero.“ (I am a Slovak, and I shall remain Slovak, even if I were to sit in the Chair of Saint Peter.).

Works 
Inspired by the movement of Enlightenment this progressive clergyman supported the spiritual development of Slovaks and their national revival. In 1822 as archbishop of Esztergom and primas of Hungary, he began the construction of the Esztergom Basilica. personally contributing  815,696 forints. It is also the place of his final rest.

 Erköltsi Keresztény Oktatások különösen a fenyitö házakban raboskodónak remélhetö megjobbitásokra (Christian Moral Teachings especially for the Betterment of Prisoners), 1819
 Kázne príhodné, ai iné, to gest: 82 reči duchownich.. (Occasional and Other Sermons, i.e.: 82 spiritual speeches...), 1833
 various pastoral letters, speeches, preaching published individually

Honours 

Esztergom, Hungary: One of the main squares of Esztergom named after Sándor Rudnay. His plaque located at the wall of Szent Anna church.
Váchartyán, Hungary: Suburban estate Rudnaykert ("Rudnay Garden") named after him. 
Bratislava, Slovakia: The square in front of St. Martin's Dome named after him.
In 2002, the Slovak Postal Office issued a stamp with a face value of 17 crowns in his remembrance.

See also
Dark Gate

References

Sources
 Mária Vyvíjalová:  Alexander Rudnay, 1998 Vydavateľstvo Matice slovenskej, 
 Markó, László: A magyar állam főméltóságai Szent Istvántól napjainkig: Életrajzi Lexikon (The High Officers of the Hungarian State from Saint Stephen to the Present Days: A Biographical Encyclopedia) (2nd edition); Helikon Kiadó Kft., 2006, Budapest; .
 Rudnay de Rudna und Divék-Ujfalá, Alexander, in Constant von Wurzbach, Biographisches Lexikon des Kaiserthums Oesterreich, 27. Band, Wien 1874.
Szinnyei József: Magyar írók élete és munkái ("József Szinnyei: Life and works of the Hungarian writers")

External links 
  Biography in Slovak
 CV in Slovak
 Postal Stamp with Alexander Rudnay 
 Web page of his native village Považany

1760 births
1831 deaths
People from Nové Mesto nad Váhom District
People from Esztergom
19th-century Hungarian cardinals
Slovak Roman Catholic priests
Archbishops of Esztergom
Hungarian nobility
Hungarian people of Slovak descent
19th-century Slovak people
Bishops of Transylvania